Olle Håkansson (22 February 1927 - 11 February 2001) was a Swedish footballer who played as a midfielder who played club football for IFK Norrköping. He represented Team Sweden at the 1958 FIFA World Cup in Sweden, and played a total number of seven international games.

References

External links
 
 
 

1927 births
2001 deaths
Swedish footballers
Sweden international footballers
Association football midfielders
IFK Norrköping players
1958 FIFA World Cup players